Bourdillon is a surname. Notable people with the surname include:

 Bernard Henry Bourdillon (1883–1948), British colonial governor
 Francis William Bourdillon (1852–1921), British poet and translator
 Frédéric Bourdillon (born 1991), French-Israeli basketball player in the Israel Basketball Premier League
 Robert Benedict Bourdillon (1889–1971), British pilot and scientist
 James Bourdillon (1811–1883), British colonial administrator in Madras
 Tom Bourdillon (1924–1956), British mountaineer
 T. F. Bourdillon (1849–1930), naturalist working in India